Inhibition is the debut studio album by alternative rock band Dot Hacker. The album was released on May 1, 2012 on ORG Music label.
The recording of Inhibition was completed in 2009, however the release was delayed until 2012 due to band members' other commitments, notably Josh Klinghoffer who joined the Red Hot Chili Peppers.

Track listing

Personnel
Dot Hacker
Josh Klinghoffer – lead vocals, guitar, keyboards, synthesizers
Clint Walsh – guitar, backing vocals, synthesizers
Jonathan Hischke – bass guitar
Eric Gardner – drums

Production
Chad Carlisle – Assistant engineer
Bernie Grundman – mastering
Adam Samuels – composer, engineer, mixing, producer
Vanessa Price – artwork
Jon Patrick Foshee - design

References

2012 debut albums
Dot Hacker albums